Erythrotherium (meaning "red beast") is an extinct genus of basal mammaliaforms from the Late Triassic to Lower Jurassic. It is related to Morganucodon. Only one species is recorded, Erythrotherium parringtoni, from Red Beds, Stormberg Group, Mafeteng, Upper Elliot and Clarens Formations, from Lesotho and South Africa.

The single jaw of Erythrotherium was found in the matrix surrounding a dinosaur fossil, by the person preparing the dinosaur, Mr C. Gow.

References

Morganucodonts
Triassic synapsids of Africa
Jurassic synapsids of Africa
Triassic South Africa
Jurassic South Africa
Fossils of South Africa
Fossil taxa described in 1964
Taxa named by Alfred W. Crompton
Prehistoric cynodont genera